Assolo is a comune (municipality) in the Province of Oristano in the Italian region Sardinia, located about  north of Cagliari and about  southeast of Oristano.

Assolo borders the following municipalities: Albagiara, Genoni, Nureci, Senis, Villa Sant'Antonio.

Demographic evolution

References

Cities and towns in Sardinia
Articles which contain graphical timelines